"Go Let It Out" is a song by English rock band Oasis, written by the band's lead guitarist, and chief songwriter, Noel Gallagher. It was released on 7 February 2000 as the first single from their fourth studio album, Standing on the Shoulder of Giants (2000), as well as their first following the departure of rhythm guitarist Bonehead and bassist Guigsy. The song peaked at number one on the UK Singles Chart and was later certified Gold for sales and streams exceeding 400,000. It also reached number one in Ireland, Italy, and Spain, as well as on the Canadian Singles Chart.

Background
The song samples the drums from Johnny Jenkins' version of Dr. John's "I Walk on Guilded Splinters." Noel described the song as "the closest we came to sounding like a modern day Beatles" in the 'Lock the Box' interview found on the DVD in the special edition of Stop the Clocks (2006). Due to the departure of guitarist Bonehead and bassist Guigsy in the early recording sessions for Standing on the Shoulder of Giants, the track features only Liam Gallagher (vocals), Noel Gallagher (guitar, bass guitar, mellotron), and Alan White (drums). It also contains a drum loop. Oasis were looking for replacements for founding members Bonehead and Guigsy and while Bonehead was replaced with fellow Creation signing and former Heavy Stereo frontman Gem Archer, Guigsy proved harder to replace. Thus the video for "Go Let It Out" had to be filmed with Noel on bass, Alan on drums, Archer as lead guitarist and Liam in Noel's role as rhythm guitarist.

The B-side "Let's All Make Believe" was placed by Q magazine placing at number one on its list of the '500 best lost tracks' and at number four on its list of songs to download for the month of January 2006. Q magazine said in the description, "If Standing on the Shoulder of Giants had contained this track, it would have probably got another star." The song featured on the Japanese release of the album. In the "Lock the Box" interview, Noel considers "Go Let It Out" to be "head and shoulders" above any other songs he had written during this time, and "up there with some of the best things I've ever done."

Music video
The video was filmed on location in Surrey, England by director Nick Egan in November 1999. It features Liam singing on a double decker bus, before disembarking it and entering a field where Noel, Gem and Alan are and performing the rest of the song there. The video features an unusual lineup of the band, with Liam playing rhythm guitar, Noel playing bass, and Gem playing lead guitar.

Track listings
UK CD and 12-inch single, Australian CD single 
 "Go Let It Out"
 "Let's All Make Believe"
 "(As Long as They've Got) Cigarettes in Hell"

UK 7-inch and cassette single 
 "Go Let It Out"
 "Let's All Make Believe"

Japanese CD single 
 "Go Let It Out"
 "(As Long as They've Got) Cigarettes in Hell"
 "Helter Skelter"

Personnel
 Liam Gallagher – lead vocals, whistle
 Noel Gallagher – electric and acoustic guitars, bass, mellotron, organ
 Alan White – drums, drum loop

Charts and certifications

Weekly charts

Year-end charts

Certifications

Release history

See also
 List of number-one singles of 2000 (Ireland)
 List of number-one hits of 2000 (Italy)
 List of number-one singles from the 2000s (UK)

References

1999 songs
2000 singles
British psychedelic rock songs
Canadian Singles Chart number-one singles
Epic Records singles
Irish Singles Chart number-one singles
Number-one singles in Italy
Number-one singles in Scotland
Number-one singles in Spain
Oasis (band) songs
Song recordings produced by Noel Gallagher
Song recordings produced by Spike Stent
Songs written by Noel Gallagher
UK Independent Singles Chart number-one singles
UK Singles Chart number-one singles